Rattaporn Saetan (born January 26, 1984) is a professional footballer from Thailand.

External links
 Profile at Thaipremierleague.co.th

1984 births
Living people
Rattaporn Saetan
Rattaporn Saetan
Association football forwards
Rattaporn Saetan
Rattaporn Saetan
Rattaporn Saetan
Rattaporn Saetan
Rattaporn Saetan
Rattaporn Saetan